Bradie Ewing (born December 26, 1989) is a former American football fullback who played in the National Football League (NFL). He was born in Richland Center, Wisconsin. He played college football at Wisconsin. He was drafted by the Atlanta Falcons in the 5th round of the 2012 NFL Draft.

High school career
At Richland Center High School, Ewing was a three-sport athlete playing football, basketball, and track and field. In football, Bradie was rated number 16 best player in the state of Wisconsin by Rivals.com and Wisconsin Preps. Ewing's career numbers were 3,911 yards on 509 carries with 41 touchdowns. His senior year Ewing totaled 2,116 rushing yards on 258 carries with 24 touchdowns.

College career
Ewing lettered all four years at Wisconsin. He started out as mainly a special teams player his first two years and then became the starting fullback by his junior season while continuing to be very productive on special teams. His sophomore year, he was named Academic All-Big Ten. Junior year, he was named ESPN Academic All-District and Academic All-Big Ten. His senior year, Ewing was again named Academic All-Big Ten and was named the teams Special Teams Player of the Year. Ewing also played in the 2012 Senior Bowl.

Professional career

Pre-draft
Ewing took part in the NFL Combine at Lucas Oil Stadium in Indianapolis.

Atlanta Falcons
Ewing was selected by the Atlanta Falcons in the fifth round (157th pick overall) in the 2012 NFL Draft. He was placed on injured reserve on August 11, 2012 after tearing his ACL. He played in his first NFL game on September 8, 2013, in a loss to the New Orleans Saints, where he recorded one catch for 15 yards. The following week vs. the St. Louis Rams, Ewing separated his shoulder in the first quarter of play. Before going down, he recorded one catch for 14 yards. He was again placed on injured reserve on September 16, 2013. Ewing was waived on March 21, 2014.

Jacksonville Jaguars
On March 25, 2014, Ewing was claimed off waivers by the Jacksonville Jaguars. He was placed on injured reserved on August 18, 2014. He announced his retirement from the league on April 4, 2015.

References

External links
 
 Jacksonville Jaguars bio
 
 

1989 births
American football fullbacks
Atlanta Falcons players
Jacksonville Jaguars players
Living people
People from Richland Center, Wisconsin
Players of American football from Wisconsin
Wisconsin Badgers football players